Rev-Ola Records is a British independent record label formed in 1990 that specializes in reissues, as well as select new releases.  The label is headed by Joe Foster, a former child actor and musician/producer.  He, along with Alan McGee and Dick Green, formed Creation Records, as well as the band Biff Bang Pow!.

History
The inspiration for Rev-Ola came from the Creation Records staff's love of finding or compiling old, rare, and bizarre records.

The label was originally a subsidiary of the Creation Records publishing arm, Creation Songs, in which guise it also issued spoken word recordings by William Shatner and Ivor Cutler, as well as first-time reissues by favoured artists, such as Fred Neil and Yma Sumac.

Other executives at Rev-Ola include art director and songwriter Andy Morten, and mastering engineer Norman Blake (of Teenage Fanclub).

After Creation Records shut shop in 1999 Rev-Ola became an imprint of the Glasgow-based PoppyDisc label, founded by Foster with Paul Cardow.

Select list of artists on Rev-Ola

References
 Rev-Ola, Discogs.

British independent record labels
Record labels established in 1988
Reissue record labels